The Shakhtar Donetsk 2013–14 season is Shakhtar's twenty third Ukrainian Premier League season, and they are the current defending champions.

The 2013-14 Shakhtar Donetsk season was the clubs twenty-fourth season in which they retained their Ukrainian Premier League title and the Super Cup, whilst finishing as runners-up to FC Dynamo Kyiv in the Ukrainian Cup. In European competitions, Shakhtar finished third in their UEFA Champions League Group, and moved to the UEFA Europa League where they were knocked out at the Round of 32 by Viktoria Plzeň.

Squad

Out on loan

Transfers

In

Out

Loans out

Released

Friendlies

Competitions

Overall

Super Cup

Premier League

Results summary

Results by round

Results

League table

Ukrainian Cup

UEFA Champions League

Group stage

UEFA Europa League

Knockout phase

Squad statistics

Appearances and goals

|-
|colspan="14"|Players away from the club on loan:

|-
|colspan="14"|Players who appeared for Shakhtar who left the club during the season:

|}

Goalscorers

Clean sheets

Disciplinary record

References

External links 
 

Shakhtar Donetsk season
FC Shakhtar Donetsk seasons
Ukrainian football championship-winning seasons
Shakhtar Donetsk